L'Ascension-de-Notre-Seigneur is a parish municipality in Quebec, Canada, located within the regional county municipality of Lac-Saint-Jean-Est in the Saguenay-Lac-Saint-Jean region. Its name is French for "the Ascension of Our Lord".

The municipality had a population of 2,079 in the Canada 2021 Census.

History
The area opened for colonization in 1896 and on June 8, 1916, the parish was formed. In 1919, the place was incorporated, taking the name of the parish.

Demographics 

Population trend:
 Population in 2021: 2079 (2016 to 2021 population change: 4.6%)
 Population in 2016: 1987
 Population in 2011: 1983
 Population in 2006: 1976
 Population in 2001: 1933
 Population in 1996: 1867
 Population in 1991: 1823

Mother tongue:
 English as first language: 0%
 French as first language: 100%
 English and French as first language: 0%
 Other as first language: 0%

See also
 List of parish municipalities in Quebec

References

External links
  Municipalité de L'Ascension-de-Notre-Seigneur

Designated places in Quebec
Parish municipalities in Quebec
Incorporated places in Saguenay–Lac-Saint-Jean